Rembrandt Pussyhorse is the second full-length studio album by American experimental rock band Butthole Surfers, released in April 1986. All songs were written and produced by Butthole Surfers, except "American Woman"—which was written by Randy Bachman, Burton Cummings, Jim Kale, and Garry Peterson of The Guess Who—and "Perry", which borrows the theme music to the Perry Mason TV show starring Raymond Burr.

The album was originally released on Touch and Go, and was reissued on Latino Buggerveil in 1999. Both CD versions of the album include the 1985 Cream Corn from the Socket of Davis EP.

Music
Rembrandt Pussyhorse is arguably the most experimental release in Butthole Surfers' considerably experimental catalog. Making heavy use of in-studio tape editing and sound modulation, the album adds piano, organ, and violin, among other sounds, to Butthole Surfers' then-usual battery of electric guitar, bass, and dual drummers. According to guitarist Paul Leary and lead vocalist Gibby Haynes, Butthole Surfers were a four-piece for most of these sessions, with Leary playing the majority of the bass lines.

However, not all the new instrumentation was performed by the band. The piano on "Creep in the Cellar", written by Haynes, and the organ on "Perry" were played by the recording studio's owner, who offered free studio time in exchange for being included on the album.

Also of note is the violin heard on "Creep in the Cellar". This was the result of Butthole Surfers purchasing a used 16-track tape on which a country & western band had previously recorded. Upon playing their mix of "Creep in the Cellar", the band discovered they had inadvertently kept one of the country band's channels, which contained a backwards violin track. Liking the way it worked with the song, they opted to keep it. They were also too tired to care about editing it out.

Finally, the growls on "Mark Says Alright" are from a pit bull that the band owned at the time named Mark Farner of Grand Funk Railroad, after the musician Mark Farner, guitarist for the band Grand Funk Railroad.

Background
Drummer King Coffey said that Rembrandt Pussyhorse was originally intended as an EP, but eventually evolved into a full-length album. Recording took place over a number of months and in a handful of studios (primarily one in San Antonio, Texas) to fit into the band's then-grueling touring schedule. Most of the songs were recorded on 16-track equipment.

The album was finished prior to 1985's Cream Corn from the Socket of Davis and, according to Coffey, was primarily recorded in 1984, approximately four months after the sessions for Psychic... Powerless... Another Man's Sac. Like its predecessor, this album was also originally intended for release on Alternative Tentacles, though with a different mix, song selection, and title (Rembrandt Pussy Horse). However, after delaying for nearly a year, the label refused to release it. Though it eventually surfaced on Touch and Go, its release was further delayed when the band opted to record the songs "Sea Ferring" and "Mark Says Alright" to replace "To Parter" and "Tornadoes," rather than recycle them after their inclusion on the Cream Corn... EP. Outtakes from those sessions can be found on 2002's Humpty Dumpty LSD. The track "Strangers Die Everyday" is used during the end credits of Richard Linklater's film Slacker. The movie also includes a cameo by Butthole Surfers drummer Teresa Nervosa.

Track listing
All songs written by Butthole Surfers, except where noted.

Side 1

Side 2

US CD reissue bonus tracks
 "Moving to Florida" – 4:32
 "Comb" – 4:57
 "To Parter" – 4:20
 "Tornadoes" – 2:36

Tracks 10–13 are from the Cream Corn from the Socket of Davis EP.

Personnel
 Gibby Haynes – lead vocals
 Paul Leary – guitar, bass
 Trevor Malcolm – bass (on "Sea Ferring" and "Mark Says Alright")
 King Coffey – drums
 Teresa Nervosa – drums
 Bob O'Neill – piano on "Creep in the Cellar", organ on "Perry"

Charts

References

1986 albums
Butthole Surfers albums